Domingos Elias Alves Pedra, commonly known as Dé Aranha (born 16 April 1948), is a retired Brazilian footballer who played as a forward for several Série A clubs.

Born in started his career in 1967 with Bangu, playing four served by Vasco da Gama, Sporting, Botafogo, Al Hilal, Bangu, Bonsucesso, Rio Branco and Desportiva Ferroviária. It was one of the attackers more opportunists in the 1970s. making success alongside Roberto Dynamite and having trained the various teams, among them Rio Branco, Bangu, Anapolina, Fortaleza, Botafogo, Joinville, Moto Club, Duque de Caxias, Olaria and América. Since 2014 acts as a commentator on the Band Rio version of the program the Os Donos da Bola and also in Bradesco Esporrtes FM was SBT, in 2014 and in the same year was Rádio Globo, where comment on programs and sports days of the broadcaster.

Honours

Player
 Vasco da Gama
 Campeonato Brasileiro Série A: 1974

Sporting 
 Primeira Liga: 1973-74
 Taça de Portugal: 1973-74

Rio Branco
Campeonato Capixaba: 1983, 1984, 1985

Al Hilal
 King Cup: 1980

Manager 
Rio Branco
Campeonato Capixaba: 2010

References

1948 births
People from Paraíba do Sul
Living people
Association football forwards
Brazilian footballers
Brazilian expatriate footballers
Expatriate footballers in Portugal
Expatriate footballers in Saudi Arabia
Brazilian football managers
Campeonato Brasileiro Série A players
Campeonato Brasileiro Série B players
Primeira Liga players
Campeonato Brasileiro Série B managers
Campeonato Brasileiro Série C managers
Bangu Atlético Clube players
CR Vasco da Gama players
Al Hilal SFC players
Saudi Professional League players
Sporting CP footballers
Botafogo de Futebol e Regatas players
Bonsucesso Futebol Clube players
Rio Branco Atlético Clube players
Desportiva Ferroviária players
Rio Branco Atlético Clube managers
Desportiva Ferroviária managers
Bangu Atlético Clube managers
Associação Atlética Anapolina managers
Fortaleza Esporte Clube managers
Botafogo de Futebol e Regatas managers
Joinville Esporte Clube managers
Moto Club de São Luís managers
Duque de Caxias Futebol Clube managers
Olaria Atlético Clube managers
America Football Club (RJ) managers
Brazilian expatriate sportspeople in Saudi Arabia
Sportspeople from Rio de Janeiro (state)